The following are the association football events of the year 1986 throughout the world.

Events 
 March 11 – Germany's Sigfried Held makes his debut as the manager of Iceland, losing (1–2) against Bahrain.
March 21 – Egypt wins the Africa Nations Cup in Cairo after defeating Cameroon on penalties (5–4) after a 0–0 draw after extra-time.
 June 22 – Diego Maradona scores a goal with his hand, calling it the "Hand of God goal".
June 29 – In the final of the 1986 FIFA World Cup, played for second time in Mexico City, Azteca Stadium, Argentina defeats West Germany 3–2 to win their second World Cup title.
European Cup: Steaua București 0–0 Barcelona; Steaua București won 2–0 on penalties
UEFA Cup: Two legs; 1st leg Real Madrid 5–1 1. FC Köln; 2nd leg 1.FC Köln 2–0 Real Madrid CF. Real Madrid CF won 5–3 on aggregate
UEFA Cup Winners' Cup: Dinamo Kyiv 3–0 Atlético Madrid
UEFA Super Cup: Steaua București 1–0 Dinamo Kyiv
Copa Libertadores de América: Two legs; 1st leg América de Cali 1–2 River Plate; 2nd leg River Plate 1–0 América. River Plate won 3–1 on aggregate
England – FA Cup: Liverpool won 3–1 over Everton
England – Milk Cup (League Cup): Oxford United won 3–0 over Queens Park Rangers
November 6 – Alex Ferguson is appointed manager of Manchester United
December 14 – Argentina's River Plate wins the Intercontinental Cup in Tokyo by defeating Romania's Steaua București 1–0. The only goal is scored by Antonio Alzamendi in the 28th minute.

Winners Club National Championship

Asia
 - Qatar – Al-Rayyan

Europe
 - Austria – Austria Wien
 - England – Liverpool
 - FC Kuusysi
 - France – Paris Saint-Germain
 - Hungary – Budapest Honvéd
 - Ireland - Shamrock Rovers
 - Italy – Juventus
 - Netherlands - PSV Eindhoven
 - Portugal – Porto
 - Romania – Steaua București
 - Scotland – Celtic
 - Spain – Real Madrid
 - Turkey – Beşiktaş
 - West Germany – Bayern Munich

North America
 – Toronto Blizzard (NSL)
 – Rayados de Monterrey
 – Hollywood Kickers (WSA)

South America
 - Argentina – River Plate
 - Bolivia – The Strongest
 - Brazil – São Paulo
 - Colombia – América de Cali
 - Paraguay – Sol de América

International Tournaments 
 African Cup of Nations in Egypt (March 7 – 21 1986)
 
 
 
 FIFA World Cup in Mexico (May 31 – June 29, 1986)

Births

January 

 January 2 
Ediz Bahtiyaroğlu, Turkish-Bosnian footballer (d. 2012)
Nicolás Bertolo, Argentinian footballer
 January 4 
Younès Kaboul, French footballer
James Milner, English footballer
 January 7 — Grant Leadbitter, English footballer
 January 8 — Jorge Claros, Honduran international footballer
 January 9
Jéferson Gomes, Brazilian footballer
Uwe Hünemeier, German footballer
 January 10
Hideaki Ikematsu, Japanese footballer
Kenneth Vermeer, Dutch footballer
 January 17 – Mahamed Habib N'Diaye, Malian footballer
 January 22 – David Martin, English footballer

February 

 February 3 
David Edwards, Welsh footballer
Gregory van der Wiel, Dutch footballer 
 February 10 – Roberto Jiménez, Spanish footballer
 February 19 – Marta, Brazilian footballer
 February 25 – Mikhail Malykhin, former Russian professional footballer

March 

 March 4
 Arturo Carbonaro, Italian footballer
 Fasal Shahid, English cricketer
 March 16 — Boaz Solossa, Indonesian footballer 
 March 27 — Manuel Neuer, German international footballer
 March 28 — Choi Ki-suk, South Korea footballer
 March 12 —  František Rajtoral, Czech international footballer (died 2017)
 March 31 — Tony McMahon, English footballer

April 

 April 7 — Elton Jose Xavier Gomes, Brazilian footballer

May 

 May 10 – Emilio Izaguirre, Honduran footballer
 May 20 – Dexter Blackstock, Antiguan-English footballer
 May 27 – Mario Mandžukić, Croatian footballer

June 

 June 14 – Nikita Lushin, former Russian professional footballer
 June 23 – Mariano, Brazilian footballer
 June 24 – Jean, Brazilian footballer
 June 27 – Mohammed Sannie,  Ghanaian footballer

July 

 July 11 – Raúl García, Spanish footballer

September 

 September 28 —
 Andrés Guardado, Mexican footballer
 Mahmoud Rashdan, Qatari footballer

October 

 October 7 — Gunnar Nielsen, Faroese footballer
 October 13 — Bawa Mumuni, Ghanaian footballer
 October 21 — Edemir Rodríguez, Bolivian footballer

November 

 November 7 — Flavia Schwarz, Swiss former footballer
 November 9 — Roger Mathis, Swiss professional footballer
 November 25 — Craig Gardner, English youth international and coach

December 

 December 2 —
Claudiu Keșerü, Romanian footballer
Adam Le Fondre, English footballer
Piauí, Brazilian footballer (died 2014)
 December 10 — Matthew Bates, English footballer, manager and coach
 December 19 — Ryan Babel, Dutch footballer

Deaths

January

March

April 
 April 6 – Raimundo Orsi, Argentine/Italian striker, winner of the 1934 FIFA World Cup. (84)

July

September

References

External links
  Rec.Sport.Soccer Statistics Foundation
  VoetbalStats

 
Association football by year